Back to Times of Splendor is the full-length debut album by the German band Disillusion. It contains a concept-based story, written by Vurtox; with each song dividing the story into separate conjoined sections (or chapters). The album received critical acclaim upon release and is considered by many to be a modern metal classic.

Track listing 
 All Songs Written By Disillusion.

Personnel

Disillusion 
 Vurtox − vocals, guitar, acoustic guitar, bass guitar, keyboards, orchestral arrangements
 Rajk Barthel − guitar
 Jens Maluschka − drums

Additional musicians 
 Thomas Bremer − piano on "... And the Mirror Cracked"
 Matthias Schifter − fretless bass on "And the Mirror Cracked" and "A Day by the Lake"
 Denise Schneider − female voice on "Fall" and "The Sleep of Restless Hours"
 Stefan Launicke − piano intro on "Back to Times of Splendor" strings on "The Sleep of Restless Hours"
 Alex Tscholakov − drum loops and percussion on "Alone I Stand in Fires"

Production 
 Recorded May through Nov. 2003 by Vurtox and Jan Stצlzel at Salvation Recording, Leipzig
 Vocals and acoustic guitars recorded by Alexander Tscholakov
 Mixed by Alexander Tscholakov, Vurtox and Disillusion during December to January 2003 at TAM Recordings
 Mastered at Mastersound Studio (Fellbach) January 2004 by Alexander Krull and Disillusion

References 

2004 debut albums
Disillusion (band) albums
Metal Blade Records albums